One person was killed and about 100 injured in a suicide bombing by the 27-year-old Palestinian Wafa Idris on January 27, 2002 in the center of Jerusalem.

The attack
On Sunday, 27 January 2002, the 28-year-old Palestinian suicide bomber Wafa Idris, who worked for the Palestinian Red Crescent in Ramallah,  managed to pass through the Qalandiya checkpoint while she was driving a Red Crescent ambulance and dressed in the organization's uniform, while the explosive device was hidden in the ambulance. Although the original plan was that she would pass the explosive device to a designated person in Israel, Idris eventually decided to blow up the explosive device by herself, and as a result she updated her operative Abu Talal of her decision using her cell phone.

Idris carried the bomb in a backpack, rather than strapped to her body. She approached a shoe store located on the Jaffa Street in the center of Jerusalem and detonated the 22-pound explosive device at the entrance to the store. An 81-year-old Israeli man was killed immediately from the blast and more than 100 people were injured.

The perpetrator 

Shortly after the attack, before the bomber had been identified, Hezbollah's TV channel reported that the bomber was named Shahanaz Al Amouri, from An-Najah National University in Nablus. A few days later the Al-Aqsa Martyrs Brigade claimed responsibility for the attack and identified the bomber as Wafa Idris.

Idris was born in the Am'ari refugee camp in 1975. Her father died when she was a child. She was about 12 years old when the First Intifada started in 1987. According to her relatives, Idris served on the Am'ari refugee camp's women's committee during the first intifada, where she assisted in food distribution at times of curfew, provided social support and helped prisoners' families. Idris married her first cousin when she was sixteen. She delivered a stillborn baby when she was 23 and was told that she would never be able to carry a baby to full term. Her husband divorced her and she moved back to live with her mother, a brother and his wife and five children. She then began volunteering for the Red Crescent Society and trained as a medic. According to the Red Crescent's coordinator of Emergency Response Services, Idris volunteered every Friday, the peak time during the intifada because of frequent riots after prayer, and for two or three days in a row  when there were riots during the week.

Official reactions

See also
 List of terrorist incidents, 2002

References

External links 
 Woman bomber attacks Jerusalem – published on BBC News on January 28, 2002
 Jerusalem Bomb – published on NPR on January 28, 2002
 Woman suicide bomber strikes – published on The Guardian on January 27, 2002
 Woman suicide bomber kills Israeli and injures 140 – published on the Irish Independent on January 28, 2002

Suicide bombing in the Israeli–Palestinian conflict
Terrorist attacks attributed to Palestinian militant groups
Terrorist incidents in Jerusalem
2002 in Jerusalem
January 2002 events in Asia
Terrorist incidents in Jerusalem in the 2000s
2002 murders in Asia